Murray's house gecko (Hemidactylus murrayi) is a species of gecko. It is found in western India, Myanmar, and Malaysia. It was previously considered conspecific with Hemidactylus brookii but revalidated by Lajmi and colleagues in 2016. Its status remains unclear because the types are lost.

The specific name murrayi honours James A. Murray, a British zoologist.

References

Hemidactylus
Reptiles described in 1887
Reptiles of India
Reptiles of Malaysia
Reptiles of Myanmar
Reptiles of Borneo